Steven, Stephen, Stevie, or Steve Woods may refer to:

 Stevie Woods (musician) (1951–2014), American singer
 Stevie Woods (footballer) (born 1970), Scottish former goalkeeper
 Stephen Woods Jr. (born 1995), American professional baseball pitcher
 Steven Woods (born 1965), Canadian entrepreneur
 Steve Woods (born 1976), English footballer
 Steven Michael Woods, Jr. (born 1980), executed for murder

See also
Steve Wood (disambiguation)